is a railway station on the Seibu Yurakucho Line in Nerima, Tokyo, Japan, operated by the private railway operator Seibu Railway.

Lines
Shin-Sakuradai Station is served by the Seibu Yurakucho Line, with through trains running to and from the Seibu Ikebukuro Line to the west and the Tokyo Metro Yurakucho Line to the east. It is located 1.4 km from Nerima Station. All trains stop at this station except Rapid Express and S-Train reserved-seat trains.

Station layout
Shin-Sakuradai Station is the only underground station owned by Seibu (Kotake-Mukaihara is owned by Tokyo Metro), and consists of two side platforms serving two tracks. The station concourse is located on the first basement ("B1F") level, and the platforms and tracks are located on the second basement ("B2F") level.

Platforms

History
Shin-Sakuradai Station opened on 1 October 1983.

Through services to and from the Tokyo Metro Fukutoshin Line began in 2008.

Station numbering was introduced on all Seibu Railway lines during fiscal 2012, with Shin-Sakuradai Station becoming "SI38".

Passenger statistics
In fiscal 2013, the station was the 73rd busiest on the Seibu network with an average of 7,365 passengers daily.

The passenger figures for previous years are as shown below.

See also
 List of railway stations in Japan

References

External links

 Shin-Sakuradai Station information (Seibu Railway) 

Railway stations in Japan opened in 1983
Seibu Yūrakuchō Line
Stations of Seibu Railway
Railway stations in Tokyo